Robert Barr (1865 – 1935) was a Scottish footballer who played in the Football League for Bury, Preston North End and Stoke.

Career
Barr started his career with Hurlford United before moving south of the border to Stoke in 1888 in time for the first season of the Football League. Barr played three matches for Stoke before returning to Scotland with Abercorn where he would spend the next five years. He re-entered English football again in 1894 with Preston North End and then with Bury a year later.

Career statistics

References

Scottish footballers
Preston North End F.C. players
Bury F.C. players
Stoke City F.C. players
English Football League players
Scottish Football League players
1935 deaths
1865 births
Abercorn F.C. players
Association football forwards
Footballers from Kilmarnock
Hurlford United F.C. players
Reading F.C. players
Albion Rovers F.C. players
Barrow A.F.C. players